An ell (from Proto-Germanic *alinō, cognate with Latin ulna) is a northwestern European unit of measurement, originally understood as a cubit (the combined length of the forearm and extended hand). The word literally means "arm", and survives in the form of the modern English word "elbow" (arm-bend). Later usage through the 19th century refers to several longer units, some of which are thought to derive from a "double ell".

An ell-wand or ellwand was a rod of length one ell used for official measurement.   Edward I of England required that every town have one.  In Scotland, the Belt of Orion was called "the King's Ellwand". An iron ellwand is preserved in the entrance to Stånga Church on the Swedish island of Gotland, indicating the role that rural churches had in disseminating uniform measures.

Several national forms existed, with different lengths, including the Scottish ell , the Flemish ell [el] , the French ell [aune] , the Polish ell , the Danish alen , the Swedish aln  and the German ell [] of different lengths in Frankfurt (54.7 cm), Cologne, Leipzig (Saxony) or Hamburg.

Select customs were observed by English importers of Dutch textiles; although all cloths were bought by the Flemish ell, linen was sold by the English ell, but tapestry was sold by the Flemish ell.

The Viking or primitive ell was used in Iceland up to the 13th century. By the 13th century, a law set the "stika" as equal to 2 ells which was the English ell of the time.

Historic use

England 
In England, the ell was usually exactly , or a yard and a quarter. It was mainly used in the tailoring business but is now obsolete. Although the exact length was never defined in English law, standards were kept; the brass ell examined at the Exchequer by Graham in the 1740s had been in use "since the time of Queen Elizabeth".

Other English measures called an ell include the "yard and handful", or 40 in. ell, abolished in 1439; the yard and inch, or 37 in. ell (a cloth measure), abolished after 1553 and known later as the Scotch ell＝37·06; and the cloth ell of 45 in., used until 1600. See yard for details.

Scots
The Scottish ell was standardised in 1661, with the exemplar to be kept in the custody of Edinburgh. It comes from Middle English .

It was used in the popular expression "Gie 'im an inch, an he'll tak an ell" (equivalent to "Give him an inch and he'll take a mile" or "... he'll take a yard", and closely similar to the English proverb "Give him an inch and he'll take an ell", first published as "For when I gave you an inch, you tooke an ell" by John Heywood in 1546.

The Ell Shop (1757) in Dunkeld, Perth and Kinross (National Trust for Scotland), is so called from the 18th-century iron ell-stick attached to one corner, once used to measure cloth and other commodities in the adjacent market-place. The shaft of the 17th-century Kincardine mercat cross stands in the square of Fettercairn, and is notched to show the measurements of an ell.

Scottish measures were made obsolete, and English measurements made standard in Scotland, by an Act of Parliament, the Weights and Measures Act 1824.

Other 
Similar measures include:
El 	Netherlands 		1 metre. (Old ell＝27·08 inches).
Ell 	Jersey 		4 feet.
Ella 	N. Borneo 		1 yard.
Elle 	Switzerland 		0·6561 yard.

In literature
Ells are used for measuring the length of rope in J. R. R. Tolkien's The Lord of the Rings.

In the epic poem Sir Gawain and the Green Knight, the Green Knight's axe-head was an ell (45 inches) wide.

Ells were also used in the medieval French play The Farce of Master Pathelin to measure the size of the clothing Pierre Pathelin bought.

Halldór Laxness described Örvar-Oddr as twelve Danish ells tall in Independent People, Part II, "Of the World".

References

 Attribution
  See p. 861.

Further reading
 Collins Encyclopedia of Scotland
 Scottish National Dictionary and Dictionary of the Older Scottish Tongue
 Weights and Measures, by D. Richard Torrance, SAFHS, Edinburgh, 1996,  (N.B.: The book focusses exclusively on Scottish weights and measures.)

External links 
 

Human-based units of measurement
Obsolete units of measurement
Obsolete Scottish units of measurement
Units of length